I'm Sorry That Sometimes I'm Mean is Kimya Dawson's debut solo album, released in 2002.

Track listing

References

Kimya Dawson albums
2002 debut albums
Sanctuary Records albums
Rough Trade Records albums